Friedebert Tuglas short story award is an Estonian literary award. The award was established in 1970 by Friedebert Tuglas itself. First recipients was chosen out in 1971 by Tuglas itself.

Recipients
1971
Jaan Kross: Neli monoloogi Püha Jüri asjus. Tallinn 1970
Paul Kuusberg: Roostetanud kastekann. Looming 7/1970

1972
Friedebert Tuglas (postum): Helloi maa. Looming 2/1971
Jaan Kross: Pöördtoolitund. Looming 1/1971

1973
Arvo Valton: Ohtlik leiutis, in: Õukondlik mäng. Tallinn 1972
Rein Saluri: Mälu. Looming 4/1972

1974
Heino Väli: Veri mullal. Looming 3/1973
Mari Saat: Katastroof. Tallinn 1973

1975
Uno Laht: Meie, tippkutid, üle kogu maakera, in: Bordelli likvideerimine. Tallinn 1974
Mats Traat: Kohvioad. Tallinn 1974

1976
Mati Unt: Via regia. Tallinn 1975
Kersti Merilaas: Eilsete perest. Looming 8/1975

1977
Juhan Peegel: Väekargajad. Looming 1/1976
Betti Alver: Kõmpa. Looming 11/1976

1978
Paul Kuusberg: Võõras või õige mees? Looming 9/1977.
Teet Kallas: Tagasi suurte kivide juurde, in: Insener Paberiti juhtum. Tallinn 1977

1979
Arvo Valton: Mustamäe armastus, in: Mustamäe armastus. Tallinn 1978
Toomas Vint: Arthur Valdese lugu. Looming 11/1978

1980
Jaan Kruusvall: Lõhn. Looming 10/1979
Jaak Jõerüüt: Mr. Dikshit. Looming 4/1979

1981
Rein Saluri: Lõimetishoole. Looming 11/1980
Mihkel Mutt: Õpilane Fabian, in: Fabiani õpilane. Tallinn 1980

1982
Aadu Hint: Tiina(d). Looming 2/1981
Vaino Vahing: Machiavelli kirjad tütrele II. Looming 12/1981

1983
Aino Pervik: Anna, in: Impuls. Tallinn 1982
Asta Põldmäe: Kuumalaine. Looming 5/1982

1984
Erni Kruste: Rio Grande. Looming 10/1983
Toomas Vint: See nii ootamatu ja ebamugav surm, in: Tantsud Mozarti saatel. Tallinn 1983
 
1985
Einar Maasik: Et rääkisin puudega?, in: Tere, Maria. Tallinn 1984
Ülo Mattheus: Minu isa luulud, in: Sõna 7. Tallinn 1984

1986
Mari Saat: Elsa Hermann, in: Õun valguses ja varjus. Tallinn 1985
Andres Vanapa: Surnutele on ladu avatud. Looming 8/1985

1987
Lehte Hainsalu: Selle talve isa. Vikerkaar 3/1986
Jaan Undusk: Sina, Tuglas. Looming 2/1986

1988
Rein Saluri: 5.3.53. Looming 5/1987
Leo Anvelt (postum): Külm heldus, in: Uidang mitme tundmatuga. Tallinn 1987

1989
Raimond Kaugver: Elupäästja. Edasi 27. Februar 1988
Toomas Raudam: Lodus tiivad, in: Igavene linn. Tallinn 1988

1990
Jaan Kross: Onu. Looming 12/1989
Rein Taagepera: Livland, Leaveland. Looming 3/1989

1991
Jaak Jõerüüt: Mr. Warma ja täiskuu valgus, in: Teateid põrgust. Tallinn 1990
Madis Kõiv: Film. Vikerkaar 7/1990

1992
Ilmar Jaks: Number 808. Looming 11/1991
Jaan Kruusvall: Rännakul. Vikerkaar 11/1991

1993
Madis Kõiv: Igavese physicuse elu. Looming 8/1992
Ilmar Talve: Eraõpetlane Abraham Hintsa. Looming 7/1992

1994
Ülo Mattheus: Buddha-mäng Borgesega päeval kell kaks. Looming 7/1993
Eeva Park: Juhuslik. Looming 12/1993
 
1995
Jaan Kross: Vürst, in: Järelehüüd. Tallinn 1994
Asta Põldmäe: Vastu ööd. Looming 9/1994

1996
Peeter Sauter: Kõhuvalu. Vikerkaar 8/1995
Mats Traat: Võimu rist. Looming 10/1995

1997
Jüri Ehlvest: Krutsiaania, in: Krutsiaania. Tallinn 1996
Emil Tode (Tõnu Õnnepalu): Külma kondid. Vikerkaar 12/1996

1998
Peeter Sauter: Tuimus. Vikerkaar 9/1997
Andrus Kivirähk: Kunstnik Jaagup. Looming 2/1997

1999
Mart Kivastik: Morn. Looming 1/1998
Ervin Õunapuu: Väike Lilli Noarootsist. Looming 10/1998

2000
Mehis Heinsaar: Liblikmees. Looming 8/1999
Andres Vanapa: Kriipslugu. Looming 10/1999

2001
 Tarmo Teder: Kohtumine. Looming 11/2000
 Mati Unt: Nouvelle. Looming 2/2000

2002
 Mehis Heinsaar: Ilus Armin. Looming 10/2001
 Mats Traat: Kohtupeegel. Looming 7/2001

2003
 Ürgar Helves (Jüri Ehlvest): Hobune eikusagilt. Looming 1/2002
 Jaan Undusk: Armastus raamatu vastu, in: Puudutus. Tartu 2002

2004
 Ilmar Jaks: Armer Adolf, in: Pimedus. Tartu 2003
 Lauri Pilter: Teisik. Vikerkaar 12/2003

2005
 Madis Kõiv: Nuuma Aljla. Looming 12/2004
 Tarmo Teder: Viimase idealisti pildid. Looming 6/2004

2006
 Armin Kõomägi: Anonüümsed logistikud. Looming 4/2005
 Ülo Tuulik: Eri Klasiga Kielis. Sirp 7. Oktober 2005

2007
 Jürgen Rooste: Pornofilm ja pudel viina. Vikerkaar 6/2006
 Mats Traat: Sarviku armastus. Looming 11/2006

2008
 Mihkel Mutt: Siseemigrant, in: Siseemigrant. Tallinn 2007
 Andrei Hvostov: Sinised mäed. Looming 6/2007

2009
 Indrek Hargla: Minu päevad Liinaga. Looming 8/2008
 Jüri Tuulik: Tellikaatne, in: Räim, pisike kena kala: valitud lugusid ja toiduretsepte. Tallinn 2008

2010
 Mehis Heinsaar: Puhkehetkel. Looming 5/2009
 Sven Vabar: Musta lennuki kirik, in: Tartu rahutused. Tartu 2009

2011
 Maarja Kangro: 48 tundi. Looming 2/2010
 Urmas Vadi: Kuidas me kõik reas niimoodi läheme. Vikerkaar 12/2010

2012
 Kätlin Kaldmaa: Kui poisid tulid. Looming 12/2011
 Toomas Vint: Pettekujutelmade linnuparv, in: Kunstniku elu. Tallinn 2011

2013
 Kai Aareleid: Tango. Looming 4/2012
 Rein Raud: Ja tuleb kord. Looming 12/2012

2014
 Maarja Kangro: Atropose Opel Meriva. Vikerkaar 4-5/2013
 Madis Kõiv: Vikat, in: Uudisjutte tegelikust ning võimalikest maailmadest; nägemused ja uned. Tallinn 2013

2015
 Mart Kivastik: Õnn tuleb magades. Vikerkaar 12/2014
 Mait Vaik: Puhtus, in: Tööpäeva lõpp. Tallinn 2014

2016
 Maimu Berg: Awakenings. Looming 8/2015
 Jüri Kolk: Sünnimärk. Looming 10/2015

2017
 Mudlum (Made Luiga): Ilma alguseta, ilma lõputa, in: Linnu silmad. Tallinn 2016
 Urmas Vadi: Auhind. Vikerkaar 4-5/2016

2018
 Armin Kõomägi: Goglomov
 Lilli Luuk: Auk

2019
 Tiit Aleksejev: Tõlkija
 Jan Kaus: Õnnelik lõpp

2020
 P. I. Filimonov: Sebastian Rüütli tõehetk
 Livia Viitol: Õpetajanna saabumine

2021
Tauno Vahter: Taevas Tartu kohal
Lilli Luuk: Kolhoosi miss

2022
Piret Raud: Pink
Toomas Haug: Mustjala. Tõestisündinud lugu

References

External reading
 August Eelmäe. Friedebert Tuglase novelliauhinna asutamislugu. In: Keel ja Kirjandus 1/1988, pages 43–45

Estonian literary awards